Euphaedra adolfifrederici is a butterfly in the family Nymphalidae. It is found from Cameroon to the south-western part of the Democratic Republic of the Congo.

References

Butterflies described in 1920
adolfifrederici